The City Stadium is a multi-use stadium in Gjakova, in western Kosovo. It is used mostly for football matches and is the home ground of KF Vëllaznimi of the Kosovar Superliga. The stadium has a capacity of 6,000 people.

References

Gjakova
KF Vëllaznimi
Gjakova